Cham Hesar (also Romanized as Cham Ḩeşār; also known as Cham Ḩeşār-e ‘Olyā) is a village in Itivand-e Jonubi Rural District, Kakavand District, Delfan County, Lorestan Province, Iran. At the 2006 census, its population was 114, in 21 families.

References 

Towns and villages in Delfan County